St Mary's Catholic Church is located in Melbourne's first seaport of Williamstown, Melbourne, Australia. Originally constructed in the early 19th century, St Mary's was only the second Catholic Church to be constructed in the Port Phillip District of New South Wales (which would later become the colony of Victoria), after St. Francis Catholic Church, in Melbourne.

There have been a total of three structures located on the site, the first being a timber chapel, later being replaced by an earlier stone structure c.1870. Later, a larger stone structure was built, which still stands on the site today.

Originally designed to incorporate a steeple, this was modified by the Archdiocese at the time, allowing for the construction of St Patrick's Cathedral, in Melbourne.

In 1933, the spire, transepts, sanctuary, side chapels and sacristy were added, in accordance to the original design of W.P. Connolly.

Parish Priests 
Below are listed the Parish Priests of St Mary's Church and the dates served, as determined by their first and last Baptism, listed in the Parish Baptismal Register.

References

External links
http://www.ohta.org.au/organs/organs/WilliamstownRC.html

Roman Catholic churches in Melbourne
Williamstown, Victoria
Buildings and structures in the City of Hobsons Bay
1842 establishments in Australia
Churches completed in 1933